25C-NB4OMe (2C-C-NB4OMe, NB4OMe-2C-C) is a derivative of the phenethylamine hallucinogen 2C-C, which acts as a highly potent partial agonist for the human 5-HT2A receptor.

Legality

United Kingdom

References 

25-NB (psychedelics)
Designer drugs